Ayiramthengu is a village in Oachira Block Panjayath in Kollam, Kerala, India. It comes under Oachira Panchayat. It belongs to South Kerala Division. It is located 30 km towards North from District headquarters Kollam. 5 km from Oachira.

References

Villages in Kollam district